Square Window is a promotional 3" CD EP by Squarepusher, distributed only with pre-orders of Ultravisitor from Warp Records' online store. The five songs on this EP were also included on the second disc of the Japanese version of Ultravisitor.

Track listing
"Square Window"  – 5:01
"Abacus 2"  – 5:13
"Venus No. 17"  – 6:44
"Itti-Fack"  – 0:44
"Melt 14.6"  – 1:16

References
Discogs entry

2004 EPs
Squarepusher EPs